Niyom Prasertsom (born 3 July 1943) is a Thai boxer. He competed at the 1964 Summer Olympics and the 1968 Summer Olympics. At the 1964 Summer Olympics, he lost to István Tóth of Hungary in the Round of 64.

References

External links
 

1943 births
Living people
Niyom Prasertsom
Niyom Prasertsom
Boxers at the 1964 Summer Olympics
Boxers at the 1968 Summer Olympics
Niyom Prasertsom
Asian Games medalists in boxing
Boxers at the 1966 Asian Games
Niyom Prasertsom
Medalists at the 1966 Asian Games
Light-welterweight boxers
Niyom Prasertsom
Niyom Prasertsom